RMLS may refer to:

Rifled muzzle loader, a mid-19th century artillery piece 
Regional Multiple Listing Service, a tool employed by real estate brokers
Regional or Minority Languages, as defined in the European Charter for Regional or Minority Languages